Ben McLachlan and Yasutaka Uchiyama were the defending champions but chose not to participate together. McLachlan played alongside Jan-Lennard Struff and successfully defended the title, defeating Raven Klaasen and Michael Venus in the final, 6–4, 7–5. Uchiyama teamed up with Joe Salisbury, but lost in the semifinals to Klaasen and Venus.

Seeds

Draw

Draw

Qualifying

Seeds

Qualifiers
  Fabrice Martin /  Gilles Simon

Qualifying draw

References
 Main Draw
 Qualifying Draw

Doubles